Castilleja christii is a rare species of flowering plant in the family Orobanchaceae known by the common name Christ's Indian paintbrush. It is endemic to Idaho in the United States, where there is a single population on Mount Harrison in the Albion Mountains in the Minidoka Ranger District of Sawtooth National Forest. It is one of Idaho's rarest plants.

This plant was named for John Henry Christ (1896–1973), who first collected it. The lance-shaped leaves are a few centimeters long and may be divided into lobes. The inflorescence is covered in glandular hairs. Blooming occurs in July and August. The plant reproduces by seed.

It occurs in grassy meadow habitat alongside Festuca idahoensis and Elymus trachycaulus, a snowbed habitat with Solidago multiradiata, Erigeron peregrinus, Lupinus argenteus, and Cymopterus davisii, and openings in sagebrush. The climate is subalpine. The soils are shallow and there are no trees.

The only population of this plant is managed by the Sawtooth National Forest. The population fluctuates in numbers, sometimes reaching over one million individuals, but is declining overall. The main threat to the species is habitat loss, which has occurred with the construction of roads in the area. Some vehicles also go off-road, despite barriers to prevent this activity. Some cattle grazing occurs in the habitat, but fencing protects some parts of it. Smooth brome (Bromus inermis) has been introduced into the habitat, where it is a noxious weed.

References

External links

christii
Plants described in 1973
Cassia County, Idaho
Flora of Idaho